The Gadsden Peaks are a line of northeast-trending peaks on a ridge,  long. Antarctica. They were mapped by the United States Geological Survey from surveys and U.S. Navy aerial photographs, 1960–63, and were named by the Advisory Committee on Antarctic Names for Michael Gadsden, a radioscience researcher at McMurdo Station, Hut Point Peninsula, Ross Island, 1965–66 and 1967–68. These peaks lie situated on the Pennell Coast, a portion of Antarctica lying between Cape Williams and Cape Adare.

References

Mountains of Victoria Land
Pennell Coast